The 2006–07 Montenegrin First Handball League was first season of the Montenegrin First League of Men's Handball, Montenegro's premier handball league.

Participants 

First season of Montenegrin Handball League was established two months after the Montenegrin independence. As the National Handball Federation of Montenegro proposed, First league in its first season has eight participants. Among them were two clubs which played in 2005/06 First League of Serbia and Montenegro (Lovćen and Berane) and six teams which previously (at the season 2005/06) participated in the second level (Pljevlja, Mornar, Sutjeska, Mojkovac, Boka and Cepelin).

Following the propositions of the new competition, league had two parts. During the first, there was 14 weeks, and after that, First League was split into two parts. Four best clubs participated in the TOP4 league for champion, and the last four played in relegation league.

First part 

During the first part of the season, all members played 14 games. Four best placed teams - Lovćen, Berane, Sutjeska and Mornar continued season in the TOP4 league for champion. Other teams were playing league for relegation.

Table of the first part of the season:

TOP4 / relegation league 

At the final phase, RK Lovćen Cetinje won the first champions trophy in the independent Montenegro. In the TOP4 League, Lovćen won all six matches, including two hardest games against Berane.
In the relegation league, RK Boka won the crucial matches against Cepelin, so the club from Cetinje was relegated to the Second league.

TOP4 League

Relegation League

Summary 

 Promotion to the EHF Cup 2007/08: Lovćen Cetinje, Sutjeska Nikšić
 Promotion to the EHF Cup Winners' Cup 2007/08: Berane
 Promotion to the EHF Challenge Cup 2007/08: Mornar Bar, Mojkovac
 Relegation to the Second League 2007/08: Cepelin Cetinje
 Promotion to the First league 2007/08: Budućnost Podgorica

Handball leagues in Montenegro
Hand
Hand
Monte